Zach Bitter is an American ultramarathon runner. He held world records for the 100-mile run (track) and the 12-hour run (track). Bitter claimed both records with his performance during the Six Days in the Dome event in Milwaukee, Wisconsin, on August 24, 2019. His 100-mile time of 11 hours, 19 minutes and 13 seconds, bested Oleg Kharitonov’s 2002 world record by almost 11 minutes, and was more than 20 minutes faster than his own American mark of 11:40:55. After claiming the 100-mile record, Bitter continued running for another 40 minutes and upped his own 12-hour distance world record to 104.8 miles, an improvement of more than three miles over the previous mark. His 12-hour record was beaten by Lithuanian Aleksandr Sorokin in January 2022.

Bitter attended the University of Wisconsin - Stevens Point from 2005-2008 and was a member of the Track and Field and Cross Country teams.

"At UW-SP, I learned that I seemed to get better as the distances got longer, so to me, ultra-running was a logic sport," said Bitter.

References

Year of birth missing (living people)
Living people
American male ultramarathon runners
University of Wisconsin–Stevens Point alumni